1997 Czech Lion Awards ceremony was held on 28 February 1998. Buttoners has won 4 Awards.

Winners and nominees

Non-statutory Awards

References

1997 film awards
Czech Lion Awards ceremonies